Kim Hee-jung (born December 4, 1970) is a South Korean actress. She made her acting debut after auditioning at SBS's open call for actors in 1991. Kim is best known for her roles in the Korean dramas First Wives' Club (2007-2008), Tae-hee, Hye-kyo, Ji-hyun (2009), Three Brothers (2009-2010), and Living in Style (2011-2012).

Filmography

Television series

Web series

Film

Awards and nominations

References

External links
 

1970 births
Living people
South Korean television actresses
South Korean film actresses
Chung-Ang University alumni
20th-century South Korean actresses
21st-century South Korean actresses
Gimhae Kim clan